Euphorbia razafinjohanyi is a species of plant in the family Euphorbiaceae. It is endemic to Madagascar.

References

Endemic flora of Madagascar
razafinjohanyi
Data deficient plants
Taxonomy articles created by Polbot